Orthorhinus cylindrirostris, commonly known as the elephant weevil, is a species of Curculionidae. In Australia they are considered a major pest to wine companies.

Description
Color and size are extremely variable with the adult size ranging between 10 and 20mm. Typically there is a tubercle on both sides of the pronotum, both elytron have two tubercles on the 2nd interstices. The 5th interstice has similar tubercle on posterior declivity. A male's antennae are much closer to the apex of the rostrum, they also have longer forelegs than females. The three basal tarsal segments are more expanded in the male than the female. Females are less cylindrical, more coarse and shorter than the males.

Life cycle 
The weevil and larvae both feed on various species of Eucalypts.

Gallery

References 

 
 
 

Beetles of Australia
Molytinae
Beetles described in 1825